Gino Francisco Costa Santolalla (born 27 January 1956) is a Peruvian politician who is an Independent Congressman caucusing with the Purple Party, representing the constituency of Lima.

He previously served as Interior Minister in the Cabinet of Peru from 2002 to 2003 a United Nations official, president of the National Penitentiary Institute (INPE) and deputy defender for human rights and people with disabilities of the Ombudsman's Office.

Education 
He studied law at the Pontifical Catholic University of Peru, completed a master's degree in development studies at the University of East Anglia in 1983, and then completed his MPhil and PhD (1987) in international relations at Queens' College, Cambridge.

Career 
He worked at the United Nations, first at the Center for Human Rights in Geneva, Switzerland (1988–1989) and then at peacekeeping missions in Central America.

He was part of the Electoral Verification Mission in Nicaragua (ONUVEN, 1990), the International Support and Verification Commission in Honduras (CIAV / ONU, 1990) and the Observer Mission in El Salvador (ONUSAL, 1990-1994).

In El Salvador, he was an advisor to three successive Chiefs of Mission responsible for implementing the Peace Accords between the FMLN guerrillas and the Alfredo Cristiani government that ended a decade of civil war. He had a leading role in the creation of the new police force.

Back in Peru, he collaborated with Jorge Santistevan de Noriega in the establishment of the Ombudsman's Office in 1996, serving as Executive Secretary of the Ad-hoc Commission of Pardons for terrorism cases between 1996 and 1999 and as Deputy Defender for Human Rights and People with Disabilities between 1997 and 2000.

After the fall of the government of Alberto Fujimori and during the Transitional government of Valentín Paniagua (2001) he was president of the National Penitentiary Institute (INPE).

Costa then worked at the United Nations and served as Deputy Interior Minister from 2001 to 2002 before being promoted to head the Ministry.

After the fall of the government of Alberto Fujimori and during the Transitional government of Valentín Paniagua in 2001, he was president of the National Penitentiary Institute (INPE).

Political career 
On July 12, 2002, he was appointed Minister of the Interior by President Alejandro Toledo . As minister, he played a leading role in the police reform effort in the country and in the creation of the national citizen security system.

Since July 26, 2016, he has served as a member of the Congress of Peru. At the end of 2017, he resigned from the Peruvians for Change (PPK) bench due to discrepancies in how the humanitarian pardon was granted to former President Alberto Fujimori.

In March 2020, he introduced an anti-police brutality bill to establish laws for the proportional use of force by authorities in Peru. He also criticized members of congress for ignoring the bill, stating "now that we have police and military in the streets looking after us, Parliament cannot give the signal that they can use their weapons as they please", referencing the enforced curfews in response to the COVID-19 pandemic in Peru.

References

1956 births
Living people
Pontifical Catholic University of Peru alumni
Alumni of the University of East Anglia
Alumni of Queens' College, Cambridge
Academic staff of the University of San Martín de Porres
Members of the Congress of the Republic of Peru
Peruvians for Change politicians
People from Lima